Stephen Jakobi OBE (born 1935) is an English writer and human rights lawyer who is a former chief executive of Fair Trials Abroad (now Fair Trials), which he founded in 1992. 

Jakobi, who was born in Ealing, London in 1935 to German-Jewish parents, Gerdy and Julius Jakobi, was brought up there and in Gerrards Cross, Buckinghamshire. When his parents divorced in 1945, he went to live with his father and was sent to boarding school at Malvern College. He graduated from Clare College, Cambridge in 1956 after doing National Service. He has a law degree from the University of Cambridge and an MA in creative writing from the University of Roehampton. He worked in industry before qualifying as a solicitor and was in private practice as a criminal lawyer before founding Fair Trials Abroad. He was appointed an Officer of the Order of the British Empire in 2005.

He and his wife Sally, a retired Jungian analyst, married in 1964 and live in  Ham in the London Borough of Richmond upon Thames. They have a son, Nicholas, and a daughter, Francesca,  who is a published novelist and a journalist with the Financial Times.

Works
 Freeing the Innocent: From Bangkok Hilton to Guantanamo (2015), 272pp,  Book Guild Publishing Ltd, 
 In the Mind of a Female Serial Killer (2017), 147pp, Pen and Sword Books, 
 Misjudged Murderesses: Female Injustice in Victorian Britain (2019), 256pp, Pen and Sword Books,

References

External links
 Jakobi's articles and letters in The Independent
 Jakobi's articles for Politico

1935 births
Living people
20th-century English Jews
20th-century English lawyers
21st-century English Jews
21st-century English lawyers
21st-century English male writers
Alumni of Clare College, Cambridge
Alumni of the University of Roehampton
British nonprofit chief executives
English crime writers
English nonprofit executives
English people of German-Jewish descent
English solicitors
Ham, London
Human rights lawyers
Lawyers from London
Officers of the Order of the British Empire
People from Ealing
People educated at Malvern College
Writers from London
21st-century English non-fiction writers